"Do You Wanna Get Away" is a 1985 song by American dance pop singer Shannon. It was released as the lead single from her second studio album of the same name. It was her third number one dance chart hit in less than two years. The single spent two weeks at number one on the US Dance Club Play chart, and reached the top 20 on US Soul Singles chart and charted on the US Hot 100.

Track listing

US 12" Single

Charts

See also
List of number-one dance singles of 1985 (U.S.)
List of post-disco artists and songs

References

1985 singles
1985 songs
Shannon (singer) songs
Post-disco songs
Song recordings produced by Chris Barbosa
Songs written by Chris Barbosa
Mirage Records singles